Prairie Ridge is a census-designated place (CDP) in Pierce County, Washington, United States. The population was 12,288 at the 2020 census.

Geography
Prairie Ridge is located at  (47.145326, -122.148230).

According to the United States Census Bureau, the CDP has a total area of 4.3 square miles (11.1 km2), of which, 4.3 square miles (11.0 km2) of it is land and 0.23% is water.

Demographics

2000 census
As of the census of 2000, there were 11,688 people, 3,902 households, and 3,109 families living in the CDP. The population density was 2,743.9 people per square mile (1,059.3/km2). There were 4,038 housing units at an average density of 948.0/sq mi (366.0/km2). The racial makeup of the CDP was 93.38% White, 0.54% African American, 1.17% Native American, 0.91% Asian, 0.38% Pacific Islander, 0.79% from other races, and 2.84% from two or more races. Hispanic or Latino of any race were 3.36% of the population.

There were 3,902 households, out of which 47.3% had children under the age of 18 living with them, 64.4% were married couples living together, 9.3% had a female householder with no husband present, and 20.3% were non-families. 13.7% of all households were made up of individuals, and 3.4% had someone living alone who was 65 years of age or older. The average household size was 3.00 and the average family size was 3.29.

In the CDP, the age distribution of the population shows 33.2% under the age of 18, 6.3% from 18 to 24, 36.9% from 25 to 44, 17.8% from 45 to 64, and 5.8% who were 65 years of age or older. The median age was 32 years. For every 100 females, there were 103.0 males. For every 100 females age 18 and over, there were 101.8 males.

The median income for a household in the CDP was $52,367, and the median income for a family was $55,158. Males had a median income of $42,287 versus $29,121 for females. The per capita income for the CDP was $19,491. About 5.1% of families and 5.5% of the population were below the poverty line, including 6.6% of those under age 18 and 4.6% of those age 65 or over.

References

Census-designated places in Pierce County, Washington
Census-designated places in Washington (state)